U.S. Term Limits, Inc. v. Thornton, 514 U.S. 779 (1995), is a landmark U.S. Supreme Court decision in which the Court ruled that states cannot impose qualifications for prospective members of the U.S. Congress stricter than those the Constitution specifies. The decision invalidated 23 states' Congressional term limit provisions. The parties to the case were U.S. Term Limits, a nonprofit advocacy group, and Arkansas politician Ray Thornton, among others.

Background
Constitutional amendment 73 to the Arkansas Constitution denied ballot access to any federal Congressional candidate having already served three terms in the U.S. House or two terms in the U.S. Senate. (Such a candidate was not barred from being written in and winning by that method.)

Soon after the amendment's adoption by ballot measure at the general election on November 3, 1992, Bobbie Hill, a member of the League of Women Voters, sued in state court to have it invalidated. She alleged that the amendment amounted to an unwarranted expansion of the qualifications for membership in Congress enumerated in the U.S. Constitution:

and:

Also critical to the issue is the 17th Amendment, which transferred power to select U.S. senators from the state legislature, to the people of the state:

U.S. Term Limits claimed that Amendment 73 was "a permissible exercise of state power under the Elections Clause".

Both the trial court and the Arkansas Supreme Court agreed with Hill, declaring Amendment 73 unconstitutional.

Supreme Court decision
The Supreme Court affirmed by a 5-4 vote. The majority and minority articulated different views of the character of the federal structure established in the Constitution. Writing for the majority, Justice John Paul Stevens concluded:

He further ruled that sustaining Amendment 73 would result in "a patchwork of state qualifications" for U.S. representatives, and called that consequence inconsistent with "the uniformity and national character that the framers sought to ensure." Concurring, Justice Anthony Kennedy wrote that the amendment interfered with the "relationship between the people of the Nation and their National Government."

Justice Clarence Thomas, in dissent, countered:

He also noted that the amendment did not actually prevent anyone from election since it only prevents prospective fourth-termers from being printed on the ballot, not from being written in, and therefore did not overstep the qualifications clause of the federal Constitution.

See also
 Powell v. McCormack (1969)
 List of United States Supreme Court cases
 Lists of United States Supreme Court cases by volume
 List of United States Supreme Court cases by the Rehnquist Court
 Term limits in the United States

Reference

External links

United States Supreme Court cases
United States Supreme Court cases of the Rehnquist Court
United States Constitution Article One case law
United States Seventeenth Amendment case law
Term limits
United States elections case law
1995 in United States case law
United States Tenth Amendment case law
Federal elections in Arkansas
Qualifications Clause case law